Stephen, Steven or Steve Osborne may refer to:

Stephen Osborne (writer) (born 1947), Canadian writer and editor of Geist magazine
Steven Osborne (pianist) (born 1971), British pianist
Steve Osborne (born 1963), English music producer
Stephen Osborne (athlete) (born 1963), Paralympic athlete from England 
 Steve Osborne (footballer) (born 1969), English footballer